The Japanese clawed salamander (Onychodactylus japonicus) is a species of salamander in the family Hynobiidae,  endemic to Japan. Its natural habitats are temperate forests and rivers.

References

Onychodactylus
Endemic amphibians of Japan
Taxonomy articles created by Polbot
Amphibians described in 1782
Taxa named by Martinus Houttuyn